Joseph Anthony Martinez (born April 10, 1975) is an American ring announcer currently working for Mixed Martial Arts promotions Invicta FC, and the UFC.

Career

A Communications graduate of California State University, Fullerton, Martinez began his professional career in 1996 as both the public address announcer for the Lake Elsinore Storm Minor League Baseball team (a San Diego Padres affiliate) and various Cal State Fullerton athletic programs. He retired from the Storm and Cal State Fullerton in 2017 and moved from Orange County, CA to North Georgia.

Martinez has been the main ring announcer for Golden Boy Boxing since 2011 and has also been an occasional Octagon announcer for UFC since 2007, carrying over from the now merged World Extreme Cagefighting and has announced over 100 events under the Zuffa banner. More recently, he was signed by the Professional Fighters League PFL in 2018 to handle MC duties for the organization's inaugural season. Martinez continued to show his multi-platform high-level abilities when he took over the ring announcing duties for the GGG vs. Canelo Alvarez pay per view on HBO in September 2018 - a fight that drew over 1.1 million PPV buys.

2018 saw Martinez reach new heights in his career. He was twice hired as ring Announcer for the DirecTV MMA drama “Kingdom” and was sought after for a role in the same capacity for the upcoming Korean movie “Divine Fury”. He also headed up cage announcing duties for “Wars End” when Golden Boy Promotions promoted Chuck Liddell and Tito Ortiz to fight for a third and final time in a cage.

Martinez was twice featured on Sony PlayStation's MLB The Show videogame in 2006 and 2007. He has also been on two episodes of Kingdom a television drama on Audience Network and appeared in an AMP Energy Drink commercial. He twice toured with the Harlem Globetrotters as their announcer as well as the US Olympic softball team en route to the Australia Summer Olympics in 2000.

Martinez is married and has four children. He is a Christian minister and co-founder of Anchor of Hope Ministries while also a congregate of the Rock Church (Anaheim, CA).

Baseball, softball and basketball
In 1996, Martinez began his career as a public address announcer for the Lake Elsinore Storm, a Minor League team affiliate of the San Diego Padres. He announced the Women's College World Series in 1998 and a U.S. Olympic Softball Team tour in 2000.  From 2001 to 2002, he worked for The Harlem Globetrotters.

Boxing
Martinez became the featured ring announcer for Oscar De La Hoya's, Fox reality television series "The Next Great Champ" in 2004. In 2006 he began announcing for Guilty Boxing Promotions on ESPN Deportes.  Now he can be seen announcing for Golden Boy Promotions and other promotions on various networks around the world.

Mixed martial arts
Joe was the exclusive cage announcer for World Extreme Cagefighting from 2007 to 2010. In 2010, WEC was merged into UFC by parent company Zuffa, LLC.  Since then, he has worked with Cage Warriors Fighting Championship, announcing fights across the globe.

Joe is currently the ring announcer for Invicta FC, and the UFC, including being the cage announcer for UFC 267, where he replaced Bruce Buffer, who was sidelined by health protocols.

Other appearances
Sony PlayStation MLB 06, MLB 07, "King of the Diamond" - In-game Public Address Announcer (2006) (2007).

References

External links
http://www.AnchorOfHopeUSA.org/

1975 births
Living people
Public address announcers
People from Barstow, California
People from Apple Valley, California
Mixed martial arts announcers
American Protestants